Oscillations is the fifth studio album by the jazz artist Bill Laswell. It was released in 1996 through Sub Rosa.

Track listing

Personnel 
Adapted from the Oscillations liner notes.
Musicians
DJ Ninj – drum programming and effects (1)
Bill Laswell – bass guitar, drum programming, effects, producer
Technical personnel
Ira Cohen – photography
Robert Musso – engineering, guitar (4), effects (4), producer (4)

Release history

References

External links 
 Oscillations at Bandcamp
 

1996 albums
Bill Laswell albums
Albums produced by Bill Laswell
Sub Rosa Records albums